Raymond John Patrick Columbus  (4 November 1942 – 29 November 2016) was a New Zealand Benny Award-winning singer and songwriter, television host, music manager and entertainer, with a career spanning six decades. As the lead singer of Ray Columbus & the Invaders, his best-known hit was "She's A Mod".

Early years
Columbus attended Xavier College in Christchurch, studied tap, but was more interested in the rock 'n' roll of the era and formed his first band, The Dominoes, in 1959. Based in a church hall, in Addington, Christchurch, the band put on Saturday night dances. Often in the last bracket of songs for the night, Columbus would throw a big sombrero hat down on the floor and dance around it while the band played the Mexican Hat Dance.

Music career
Columbus got his big break playing with the Downbeats Band which later became Ray and the Drifters. He relocated to Auckland when he was offered a TV show titled Club Columbus, whereupon he changed the band's name to Ray Columbus & the Invaders in 1964. The Invaders were known for their Fender guitars, dance moves and lavish clean-cut outfits. In 1964, the Invaders released their best-known song, "She's a Mod" The track was written by British musician Terry Beale for his group The Senators, but was not a hit. However, "She's A Mod" became a number one hit in Australia – the first song from a New Zealand group to reach the top of the charts in another country. In 1965, the band released the single "Till We Kissed", which sold fifty thousand units. It was a retitled version of "Where Have You Been (All My Life)", originally recorded by Arthur Alexander in 1962, and also performed by The Beatles during their Hamburg days.

The Invaders' second album, Original Numbers, was the first album in New Zealand to include entirely self-composed songs.

After disbanding the Invaders, Columbus relocated to the United States for two years. Returning to New Zealand, he hosted numerous television pop shows, including Ray Columbus presents New Faces, C'mon, Happen Inn and That's Country (which he co-created and helped sell to a US cable network). He was also a noted music manager, mentoring artists such as singer Suzanne Lynch. In the late 1990s, he managed the rock band Zed.

As a solo artist, Columbus performed at Redwood 70, the first major modern music festival held in New Zealand, toured with The Rolling Stones, Roy Orbison and The Newbeats, as well as playing Royal Variety Performances and being an opening act of the 1974 New Zealand Commonwealth Games.

Personal life
Columbus released a biography in 2011, which stated that he had smoked for years and was a heavy drinker. He suffered a heart attack in 2004, and a stroke in 2007 that left him partially paralysed. In April 2014, he was reported to be terminally ill, from an immune deficiency condition caused by medication.

Columbus died at his Snells Beach, North Auckland residence in November 2016 aged 74, after a "four-year battle with ill health". He was survived by his wife and two children.

Discography

Solo studio albums

Compilation albums

Singles

Honours and awards 
In 1973, Columbus received the Benny Award from the Variety Artists Club of New Zealand Inc, the highest honour available to a New Zealand variety entertainer. In the 1974 Queen's Birthday Honours, he was appointed an Officer of the Order of the British Empire, for services to entertainment. In 1990, Columbus received the New Zealand 1990 Commemoration Medal for his promotion of New Zealand overseas.

Aotearoa Music Awards
The Aotearoa Music Awards (previously known as New Zealand Music Awards (NZMA)) are an annual awards night celebrating excellence in New Zealand music and have been presented annually since 1965.

! 
|-
| 1965 || "Till We Kissed" || Single of the Year||  ||rowspan="6"|
|-
| 1966 || "I Need You" || Single of the Year ||  
|-
| 1968 || "Happy in a Sad Kind of Way" || Single of the Year ||  
|-
| 1970 || "Travelling Singing Man" || Single of the Year ||  
|-
| 1971 || "People Are People" || Single of the Year ||  
|-
| 1989 || "She's a Mod" (with Double J and Twice the T) || Single of the Year ||  
|-
| 2009 || Ray Columbus (as part of Ray Columbus & the Invaders) || New Zealand Music Hall of Fame ||  ||
|-

References

Further reading 
 Ray Columbus, Ray Columbus: The Modfather: Life and Times of a Rock 'n' Roll Pioneer, Penguin Books, 2011,

External links
 sergent.com.au
 AudioCulture profile

1942 births
2016 deaths
20th-century New Zealand male singers
New Zealand pop singers
New Zealand male singer-songwriters
New Zealand people of Greek descent
Musicians from Christchurch
New Zealand Officers of the Order of the British Empire